Anacimas limbellatus is a species of horse flies in the family Tabanidae.

Distribution
United States.

References

Tabanidae
Insects described in 1923
Diptera of North America
Taxa named by Günther Enderlein